Joachim Brøchner Olsen (born 31 May 1977) is a Danish former politician and former world class shot putter. He was elected to the Danish parliament at the 2011 election, representing the Liberal Alliance in the Greater Copenhagen constituency.

As an athlete, he represented Århus 1900.

With ten straight international finals, Joachim holds the longest string of appearances in finals at Olympic, World and European Championships among throwers.

From October 2003, Olsen was coached by former olympic finalist Vesteinn Hafsteinsson.
From February 2007 until Joachim B. Olsen ended his career in July 2009, Olsen was coached by Simon Patrick Stewart.

Athletic career 
Olsen was born in Aalborg. In his teens Joachim primarily focused on the discus throw, but after switching shot put technique from the glide style to rotational style, he improved dramatically during his four years at University of Idaho, where he was coached by Tim Taylor.

Although he appeared at the World Junior Championships in Sydney 1996, where he threw the Discus, it was at the U23 European Championships in Gothenburg in 1999 he made his first international impact, winning a silver medal. At the 2000 Summer Olympics in Sydney, Olsen did not qualify for the final. Nevertheless, he received worldwide attention after he wrote in a chat room that the winner of the final, Arsi Harju had failed a doping test. The rumour was false, and the incident caused the Danish National Olympic Committee to send Joachim B. Olsen home prior to the closing of the Games.

At the 2001 World Championships in Athletics, Olsen qualified for his first international final. Since then he has qualified for every final at Olympic, World and European Championships.

In 2002 Olsen won the silver medal at the European Championships outdoor as well as indoor. In 2003 a hand injury held him back, but a revised training plan removed the pain in his wrist. Thus Olsen was ready for a comeback in 2004, and at the 2004 IAAF World Indoor Championships he won a Bronze medal - a placement he repeated at the Olympic Games in Athens. But because of a positive doping of the gold medalist Yuri Bilonog (Ukraine), which caused the cancellation of the medal, Olsen inherited the silver medal after the announcement of redistributing medals.

On 6 November 2005 Olsen injured his right ankle during practise. Several ligaments were either torn or severely damaged. On 6 February 2006 he announced, that the injury had healed sufficiently for him to compete again at highest level. A month later, at the World Indoor Championships, he managed to win a bronze medal with a throw of 21.16 metres.

On 8 August 2008 at the opening ceremony of the Beijing Olympics, Olsen was the flagbearer for Denmark. He failed to reach the final.

In 2008 Joachim Olsen became well known in the Danish publicity by his participation in, and winning of, the fifth season of the Danish version of Dancing with the Stars.

On 22 July 2009, he announced his withdrawal from shot putting, saying that while he had a dream of competing at the 2012 Summer Olympics, his physical condition would not allow it. He suffered a slipped disc in April 2009.

Political career

As part of his campaign for the 2019 general election, Olsen placed his ad on adult website Pornhub. Olsen failed to gain the necessary to continue in the general election.

Achievements

References

External links

 Personal website
 Danish Athletics Federation - profile - Joachim Olsen
 University of Idaho - Vandal Athletics Hall of Fame - Joachim Olsen
 

Danish male shot putters
Danish sportsperson-politicians
Olympic athletes of Denmark
Athletes (track and field) at the 2008 Summer Olympics
Athletes (track and field) at the 2004 Summer Olympics
Athletes (track and field) at the 2000 Summer Olympics
Olympic silver medalists for Denmark
Liberal Alliance (Denmark) politicians
Idaho Vandals men's track and field athletes
1977 births
Living people
Sportspeople from Aalborg
European Athletics Championships medalists
Medalists at the 2004 Summer Olympics
Olympic silver medalists in athletics (track and field)
Members of the Folketing 2011–2015
Members of the Folketing 2015–2019